Tsolmon Ganchimeg (born 31 May 2003) is a Mongolian footballer who plays for Women's National Football League club FC Kharaatsai and the Mongolian women's national team.

Club career
Ganchimeg played football in the school league for the first time in 2015. Shortly thereafter she was spotted by the coach of the under-16 national team Iki Yoji and included in a training camp held in Japan.  She won the Women's National Football League with Arvis FC in 2016 and 2017. In 2017 she was named the league's best midfielder and also won the under-16 league with the club.

At the end of 2019, while still with Arvis FC, Ganchimeg was again a finalist for the best female player at the Golden Ball awards. The honour ultimately went to Deren FC captain O. Tsasan-Okhin.

For the 2022 season, Ganchimeg moved to FC Kharaatsai. She was again named best midfielder in the league as her club finished in second place.

International career
Ganchimeg was part of Mongolia's squad that participated in the 2017 EAFF U-15 Girls Tournament. She went on to score against Guam on 18 April for an eventual 1–1 draw. Ganchimeg's goal was the first official tally by any Mongolian women's national team since forming and helped secure the first-ever point. Two days later the team earned the first official victory, a 2–0 result over the Northern Marianas Islands. Ganchimeg served as the team's captain in the tournament.

In September 2018 Ganchimeg was again called up to the national U16 team for 2019 AFC U-16 Women's Championship qualification. She scored in Mongolia's 8–0 victory over Pakistan to open their campaign. On the next matchday she scored again in a 1–2 defeat to Hong Kong. The following month, she was part of the national under-19 side that competed in 2019 AFC U-19 Women's Championship qualification. The side played a friendly against Australia in preparation for the tournament.

Ganchimeg was part of the first-ever senior women's national squad that was assembled for the 2019 EAFF E-1 Football Championship. She went on to score her first senior international goal in the team's first match, a 3–2 victory over the Northern Mariana Islands.

International goals
Scores and results list Mongolia's goal tally first.

International career statistics

Youth international goals
Scores and results list Mongolia's goal tally first.

Honours
Individual
MFF Golden Ball (Best Female Player): 
2017 (Winner) 
2019 (Finalist)
League Best Midfielder: 2017, 2022

Club
WNFL
Winner: 2016, 2017, 2019
Runner up: 2021, 2022

References

External links
Global Sports Archive profile
Core Scores profile

2003 births
Living people
Mongolian footballers
Association football midfielders
Mongolia international footballers